This is a list of mayors of Bulle, Switzerland.

References

Bulle
 
Bulle